The Columbia Sertoma Basketball Club was a professional basketball team. They were a part of the National Alliance of Basketball Leagues.

History
Columbia Sertoma Basketball Club competed at the 1970 edition of the Intercontinental Cup.

References

Basketball teams in the United States